Simon Archer may refer to:
 Simon Archer (badminton) (born 1973), English badminton player
 Sir Simon Archer (antiquary) (1581–1662), English antiquary and politician
 Simon Archer (author)  (1956/1957–1993), British journalist and biographer
 Simon "Ding" Archer (born 1966), English musician and producer